The Taipei Metro Beitou station (formerly transliterated as Peitou Station until 2003) is a station on the Tamsui–Xinyi line and Xinbeitou branch line), located in Beitou District, Taipei, Taiwan. The location of station can be traced back the same name station of the now-defunct TRA Tamsui line.

Station overview

The two-level, elevated station structure with one island platform and two side platforms. The washrooms are inside the entrance area. There are several amenities around the station. This include Beitou Presbyterian Church and Beitou Market.

Just north of the station, there are crossovers between the Tamsui–Xinyi line and the Xinbeitou branch line, and between the tracks of each individual line, in both directions. Also to the north, the two Tamsui Line tracks cross over each other not at grade.

South of the station, the four tracks merge into two and cross over each other at a flying junction, and there are crossovers to allow trains from Daan to terminate here.

History
On 15 July 1988; the service was discontinued in order to make way for the opening of the segment from Tamsui to Zhongshan for Taipei Metro on 28 March 1997.

From 1999 up to 2012, trains from Nanshijiao terminated at Beitou Station while construction work was conducted on the Zhonghe-Xinlu Line.

Station layout

Around the station
 Lady Zhou's Memorial Gate

First and Last Train Timing 
The first and last train timing at Beitou station  is as follows:

References

Tamsui–Xinyi line stations
Railway stations opened in 1901
Railway stations opened in 1997